Raoul Grassilli (25 October 1924 – 24 July 2010) was an Italian actor. 

Born in Bologna, Grassilli graduated from the Silvio d’Amico Academy of Dramatic Arts in 1948, and started his career on stage with Ruggero Ruggeri. Active among others in the theatrical companies of Alida Valli, Tino Buazzelli, Gino Cervi and Giorgio Strehler, he is best known for his roles in several RAI TV-series, starting from Anton Giulio Majano's Il Caso Maurizius (1961).

Selected filmography 
 The Corsican Brothers (1961) 
 Pelle viva (1962)
 Invasion 1700 (1962) 
 Desert War (1962)
 Catherine of Russia (1963)
 The Head of the Family (1967) 
 Giacomo Casanova: Childhood and Adolescence (1969) 
 Povero Cristo  (1975)

References

External links 
  

1924 births
2010 deaths
Actors from Bologna
Italian male film actors 
20th-century Italian male actors
Italian male stage actors
Italian male television actors